The Amaziah and Cornelia (Wait) Cannon House, also known as Crab Apple Grove, is a historic building located in Mason City, Iowa, United States. New York natives Amaziah and Cornelia Cannon settled here from Wisconsin in 1866 with their three children. They built this 1½-story stone house the same year in a grove of crab apple trees. It is one of three stone houses built during the settlement era remaining in Mason City. It was occupied by the Cannons and their descendants until 1963, when the present house on the farmstead was built immediately to the east. This house is currently unoccupied and in a deteriorating condition. It has been used as a workshop intermittently. The immediate area has remained rural, however. The house was listed on the National Register of Historic Places in 2004.

References

Houses completed in 1866
Vernacular architecture in Iowa
Houses in Mason City, Iowa
National Register of Historic Places in Mason City, Iowa
Houses on the National Register of Historic Places in Iowa